Phrynobatrachus francisci is a species of frog in the family Phrynobatrachidae.

It is found in Burkina Faso, Ivory Coast, Gambia, Ghana, Mali, Nigeria, Senegal, possibly Benin, possibly Guinea, possibly Guinea-Bissau, possibly Mauritania, possibly Niger, possibly Sierra Leone, and possibly Togo.
Its natural habitats are dry savanna, moist savanna, subtropical or tropical dry shrubland, subtropical or tropical moist shrubland, swampland, intermittent freshwater marshes, arable land, pastureland, rural gardens, urban areas, ponds, and canals and ditches.

References

francisci
Amphibians described in 1912
Taxonomy articles created by Polbot